Nepal participated in the 2007 Asian Winter Games held in Changchun, China from January 28, 2007 to February 4, 2007.

Participation details

Alpine skiing

Entry list
 Pramod Lama

Cross-country skiing

Entry list
 Dachhiri Sherpa

References

Nations at the 2007 Asian Winter Games
Asian Winter Games
Nepal at the Asian Winter Games